is a Japanese role-playing video game developed by Compile Heart with collaboration from GCREST and published in North America and the PAL regions by NIS America. Certain aspects of the western release have been edited and some mini-games have been disabled. A sequel titled Mugen Souls Z was released on April 25, 2013.

In November 2022, Eastasiasoft in collaboration from Compile Heart announced that a Nintendo Switch port of the game is scheduled for an April 2023 release, with all of the content uncensored.

Plot
The main protagonist of Mugen Souls, Chou-Chou, plans to conquer the universe by subjugating the seven worlds it comprises, as she thinks the planets look pretty. Traveling from world to world with her trusty companion Altis, and loyal peon Ryuto, Chou-Chou aims to turn the heroes and demon lords of each world into her 'peons' (servants), saving the world from conflict in the process.

Gameplay
Gameplay revolves around exploration and turn-based, open-field combat (same as Hyperdimension Neptunia mk2 gameplay), and the game also includes mini games and customization.

Reception

The game was met with mixed reviews. It holds a score of 55/100 on Metacritic.

Sequel
Mugen Souls Z is the sequel to Mugen Souls, released in Japan on 25 April 2013, North America on 20 May 2014 and Europe on 23 May 2014 for the PlayStation 3. The protagonist is Syrma, a goddess aiming to stop an awkward ancient threat. Gameplay aspects include level caps of 9,999, large mecha, and billion-point damage.

References

External links
 Japanese website
 English website

2012 video games
Compile Heart games
Ghostlight games
Idea Factory franchises
Nintendo Switch games
Nippon Ichi Software games
PlayStation 3 games
Role-playing video games
Single-player video games
Video games developed in Japan
Video games featuring female protagonists
Video games scored by Tenpei Sato
Windows games